The 2017–18 Eredivisie Vrouwen was the eight season of the Netherlands women's professional football league. The season took place from 1 September 2017 to 25 May 2018 with nine teams. Ajax started the season as defending champions.

Teams

On 1 March 2017, Telstar announced it was being replaced by a new club called VV Alkmaar. On 10 April 2017, Excelsior Barendrecht became the ninth team of the league's season. On 21 April 2017, VV Alkmaar was officially formed.

Source: Soccerway

Format
At the regular season, the nine teams played each other twice (once at home and once away), for a total of 16 matches each. After that the top five teams qualified for a championship play-offs and the bottom four teams play a placement play-offs. Teams played each other twice in the championship play-offs group, for a total of 8 matches each while in the placement groups teams played each other three times for a total of 9 matches each. Points accumulated at the regular season were halved and added to the points of the play-off stage rounds. There was no relegation nor promotion in the league and the champion qualified to the 2018–19 UEFA Women's Champions League.

Regular season

Standings

Results

Play-offs

Championship
The top five were set after matchday 16. Points of the first stage were halved.

Standings

Results

Placement
The bottom four were set after matchday 16. Points of the first stage were halved.

Standings

Results

1st and 2nd third

3rd third

References

External links
 Official website
 Season on soccerway.com

Netherlands
Eredivisie (women) seasons
2017–18 in Dutch women's football